The DuBose Conference Center, formally known as the DuBose Memorial Church Training School, is a historic site at Fairmont and College Streets in Monteagle, Tennessee.  It was historically an Episcopal Church training and conference center. In 2009 the Conference Center became an independent, nonprofit 501(c)3 and now operates as a camp, conference and retreat center in Middle Tennessee.

The mission of DuBose Conference Center is to "offer hospitality, programming, and sacred space to groups of all faiths and backgrounds for education, creativity, and renewal."

History of DuBose Conference Center

1872 to 1921: Fairmount College 
The site was originally established as Fairmount College in 1872 with the aid of John Moffatt, a Scottish born temperance preacher and landowner. It was Moffat and business partner Oliver Maybee who convinced Fairmount's first headmistresses, Mrs. Louise Yerger and Mrs. Harriet Kells, to move their girls' school from Jackson, Mississippi to Tennessee. Among its students, the school hosted in 1910 two of the Soong Sisters, one of whom later became Madame Chiang Kai-shek and the other, Soong Ching-ling, became wife of Sun Yat-Sen.

Silas McBee, who later gained fame as an author and architect, became principal of Fairmount College in the late 1800s (exact date not recorded). McBee turned the school into a church institution that might be “for girls what Sewanee was for young men.”

1921 to 1944: DuBose Memorial Church Training School 
In 1921, Reverend William Stirling Claiborne (1877-1933) and Dr. Mercer P. Logan founded the DuBose Memorial Church Training School on the former site of Fairmount College. Its curriculum emphasized practical rather than scholarly teaching, including such courses as “The Bible in English,” “Church History,” and “The Contents and Use of the Book of Common Prayer.” In addition to living at DuBose, many of them with established families, they raised vegetables and cattle to help maintain the school and its buildings.

The center's main building, Claiborne Hall, was rebuilt in 1924 after a large fire burned the school's original frame building.

1950's to present: DuBose Conference Center 
In the early 1950s, the Episcopal Diocese of Tennessee (which at that time encompassed the Episcopal Diocese of West Tennessee, the Episcopal Diocese of Tennessee (sometimes referred to as "the Episcopal Diocese of Middle Tennessee"), and the Episcopal Diocese of East Tennessee) purchased the buildings and grounds of the old Church Training School and reopened as the DuBose Conference Center. In 1953, Camp Gailor-Maxon, an Episcopal youth camp established in the 1920s, moved from its earlier venues to find a permanent home as an in-house program at DuBose.

The Diocese began capital improvements to the school, including the construction of four new cabins and a swimming pool. In 1958, a new outdoor pavilion was constructed to accommodate the growing Laymen’s Conference of the Episcopal Churchmen of Tennessee. The Diocese of Tennessee built Bishop's Hall, a hotel-style lodging facility, in 1973 and expanded the “Stack Room” in the Pell Library Building to create the Large Chapel. In 1975 Camp Gailor-Maxon constructed the outdoor chapel and campfire area. Four cabins for housing youth and camp groups were also constructed.

DuBose Conference Center was added to the National Register of Historic Places in 1980.

In the early 1990s a decision was made to reconfigure the board to include several “at large” members who would represent constituent user groups of the center; and to actively pursue increased utilization by other denominations and secular groups to improve business results.

In 2009, the conference center elected to transition to a 501(c)3 Nonprofit organization, still affiliated with the three Tennessee Dioceses, but run by a 21-member Board of Directors.

Another in-house program, Winterfest, was established in 2006 for high school aged Episcopalians throughout the state of Tennessee. In 2016 an on-site farm-to-table garden was established. This laid the foundation for the creation of a third in-house program in 2019, Healthy Roots, which focuses on health and wellness outreach and serves the nearby South Cumberland Plateau communities of Grundy County, Franklin County, and Marion County.

DuBose Conference Center Namesake
DuBose Conference Center is named after William Porcher DuBose, an American priest, author, and theologian in The Episcopal Church in the United States who married Mrs. Louise Yerger, headmistress at Fairmount College and served as the school's Chaplain. It was during this period of DuBose's life, while caring for the little chapel in Monteagle and serving at Fairmount, that Dr. DuBose wrote some of his greatest literature. After his retirement in 1908, he wrote High Priesthood and Sacrifice, The Reason of Life, and an autobiography, Turning Points in My Life, books which established him as a "major New Testament theologian" from his study in Monteagle. He remained at the School until this death in 1918.

References

Convention centers in Tennessee
Churches in Tennessee
Properties of religious function on the National Register of Historic Places in Tennessee
School buildings completed in 1924
Buildings and structures in Grundy County, Tennessee
Episcopal Church in Tennessee
Monteagle, Tennessee
National Register of Historic Places in Grundy County, Tennessee
1924 establishments in Tennessee